Hazrat Sultan International Airport (HSIA) ( / ), commonly known as Turkistan International Airport , is a new greenfield international airport that serves the city of Turkistan (as a replacement for the old Turkistan Airport). The airport is located near the village of Shaga,  NE of the centre of Turkistan, the capital of the Turkistan Region (formerly known as South Kazakhstan Region), in the southernmost part of Kazakhstan.

The construction of the airport started in May 2019, and was completed after one year in 2020 with a cost of around US$160 million. The new airport was constructed within the framework of a PPP (Public-Private Partnership) model between Turkish YDA Holding and the Kazakh Government and is compliant with all international standards and implemented using the latest building technologies.

It is the first greenfield airport to be developed in post-communist Kazakhstan, and the 19th commercial airport in the country. The opening ceremony of the new airport took place on the planned date of 28 September 2020. However, the airport will be put into operation and ready for deployment in January 2021. Moreover, Hazrat Sultan International Airport construction can be considered as the fastest airport facility construction in the world. The airport's IATA code, HSA, is derived from the airport's abbreviated name of Hazrat Sultan Airport.

History

Naming
During much of the planning and construction phase the new airport was known as Turkistan International Airport. However, it was later reported that the new airport will be named after «Hazrat Sultan» (meaning Holy Sultan in Kazakh) — which is one of the epithets of Sufi sheikh Khawaja Ahmed Yasawi, author of Divan-i hikmet (“Book of Wisdom”), whose mausoleum is located in Turkistan. The airport's IATA code, HSA, is derived from the airport's abbreviated name of Hazrat Sultan Airport.

Construction
The airport was constructed as a replacement for the former Turkistan Airport that is located to the east of the city. Construction work on HSIA airport began in May 2019, and was finalized in 2020, making it the fastest-constructed airport facility in the world.

Expected airlines and destinations
The first services to operate from the airport will be launched by Kazakhstan's carriers to Nur-Sultan and Almaty and later to other regions of Kazakhstan. Turkish Airlines also plans to launch three to four times weekly Istanbul service in the initial stages, with a possibility of increasing frequency in the future. It is also planned to launch direct flights between Turkistan and the holy city of Mecca (Makkah) once every two days. Hazrat Sultan International Airport will also join the Kazakhstan's 11 airports that already operate under the open skies aviation regime. The regime, which has been in effect since November 2019, which removes restrictions on a number of flights and gives a provision of fifth-degree freedom to foreign airlines

Facilities

Passenger main terminal
The passenger terminal is capable to handle up to three million passengers annually or has a capacity of 450 passengers per hour, and is equipped with a gallery landing with two gates to air-bridges and seven gates to apron buses.

Runway

Airlines and destinations

See also
 Transport in Kazakhstan
 List of airports in Kazakhstan

References

External links

 

2020 establishments in Kazakhstan
Airports established in 2020
Airports in Kazakhstan
Build–operate–transfer
Turkistan Region